Spring Valley State Park is a public recreation area adjoining the  Eagle Valley Reservoir in eastern Nevada near the border with the state of Utah.

History
The Eagle Valley Dam was built in 1965, creating the Eagle Valley Reservoir for agricultural usage. The area around the reservoir was designated a state park in 1969.

Activities and amenities
The park offers camping, fishing, a boat launch, picnicking, hiking trails, historic ranch buildings, and a group-use area.

Climate

References

External links

Spring Valley State Park Nevada State Parks

State parks of Nevada
Protected areas of Lincoln County, Nevada
Protected areas established in 1969
1969 establishments in Nevada
Reservoirs in Nevada